Mohamed Moukrim Ben Mansour (born 5 April 1938) is a Moroccan wrestler. He competed at the 1960 Summer Olympics and the 1968 Summer Olympics.

References

External links
 

1938 births
Living people
Moroccan male sport wrestlers
Olympic wrestlers of Morocco
Wrestlers at the 1960 Summer Olympics
Wrestlers at the 1968 Summer Olympics
Sportspeople from Casablanca